George Hibbard may refer to:

 George A. Hibbard (1864–1910), mayor of Boston, 1908–1910
 George E. Hibbard (1924–1991), American art collector
 George F. Hibbard (1848–1934), merchant and political figure in New Brunswick, Canada